Shrewsbury House School, commonly referred to as SHS or Shrewsbury House, is an independent day preparatory school for boys aged 7 to 13, in Surbiton at the edge of Greater London close to the Surrey border, its historic county, in England. Established in 1865 it is among the minority of extant Preparatory Schools founded before the year 1900.

A proportion of pupils achieve results at Common Entrance Examinations to gain entry to schools such as public schools.

The school has been an educational trust since 1979 administered by a Board of Governors some of whom are among its trustees. All of the Governors, except two of the educationalists and the medical expert, are former parents.

History

Shrewsbury House School was founded in 1865 by Rev. Henry Wilson, a local clergyman, in the centre of Surbiton and derived its name from the Wilson family’s association with the town of Shrewsbury in Shropshire.

In 1910 the School moved to Haulkerton, a large Victorian Arts and Crafts mansion dating, from the mid-nineteenth century, on Ditton Hill. The main house was renamed Shrewsbury House and the School has remained there ever since.

For the next 70 years, the School was operated by a series of private owners, most notably Henry Hamilton-Miller, who gave the School his family coat of arms and the motto Alta Peto. In 1979, the School became a charitable trust, administered by a Board of Governors, known as the Shrewsbury House School Trust.

In 2009, the school took over the pre-preparatory department of nearby Milbourne Lodge School, which was renamed Shrewsbury Lodge School and later Shrewsbury House Pre-Preparatory School, after The Rowans School, Wimbledon, joined the Shrewsbury House School Trust in 2017

Notable alumni

 Anthony Gross CBE, RA (1905–1984), printmaker, painter, war artist & film director
 Major General Philip 'Pip' Roberts,  (1906-1997), senior officer during the Second World War
 Sir Stirling Moss OBE (1929-2020), Formula One racing driver
 Donald Cammell (1934–1996), film director
 Ian MacLaurin, Baron MacLaurin of Knebworth (born 1937), former Chairman of Vodafone and Chairman & CEO of Tesco
 Nigel Mitchell (born 1978) TV and radio presenter
 Madison Hughes (born 1992), Captain of the United States national rugby sevens team
 Alastair Gray (born 1998), tennis player

Notes and references
References

Notes

External links
 Shrewsbury House School website

1865 establishments in England
Educational institutions established in 1865
Private boys' schools in London
Private schools in the Royal Borough of Kingston upon Thames